This is a list of blood donation agencies in different countries.

Australia 
  Australian Red Cross Lifeblood

Bangladesh 

 Bangladesh Red Crescent Society
 Sandhani
 Roktodane Sirajganj (RS)

Belgium 
 Belgian Red Cross

Canada 
 Canadian Blood Services
 Héma-Québec, provincial (Quebec only), independent from the Canadian Blood Services.

Finland 
 Veripalvelu (Finnish Red Cross Blood Service)

Germany 
 German Red Cross

Hong Kong 
 Hong Kong Red Cross Blood Transfusion Service

India 

 Akhil Bhartiya Terapanth Yuvak Parishad 
A social organization, which has active involvement in blood donation in India.
It has been involved in blood donation through major camps since 2010.

Detail of the Major Blood units collection through voluntary blood donation camps are:-

2012 -  96600 units of blood in single day 
2014 - They have collected 100212 units of blood in single day
2016 - Conducted marathon world longest blood donation drive by organizing nonstop blood donation camps from 01 Jan 2016 to 31 December 2016 in parts of country. 
2020 - Devoted their teams for Plasma Donation.
2021 - Involved themselves for SDP & RDP availability.
2022 - Collected 166539 units on 17th September.

 Rotary Blood Bank
 Friends2support
 Indian Red Cross Society
 Sankalp India Foundation
 Athar Blood Bank
 National Blood Transfusion Council

Indonesia 
 Indonesian Red Cross Society

Ireland 
 Irish Blood Transfusion Service

Israel 
 Magen David Adom

Italy 
 Associazione Volontari Italiani Sangue (AVIS)
 Italian Red Cross

Japan 
 Japanese Red Cross

Malaysia 
 National Blood Centre

Nepal 
 Nepal Red Cross Society
 Youth For Blood

New Zealand 
 New Zealand Blood Service

Philippines 
 Philippine Red Cross

Singapore 
 Health Sciences Authority

South Africa 
 South African National Blood Service

South Korea 
 Korean Red Cross

Thailand 
 Thai Red Cross Society

United Kingdom
 NHS Blood and Transplant
 Northern Ireland Blood Transfusion Service
 Scottish National Blood Transfusion Service
 Welsh Blood Service

United States

The United States does not have a centralized blood donation service.  The American Red Cross collects approximately 35% of the blood used, while the rest is collected by independent nonprofit blood centers, most of which are members of America's Blood Centers.  The US military collects blood from service members for its own use, but also draws blood from the civilian supply.

See also
 Blood donation
 Blood bank

References 

Blood donation agencies
Blood donation agencies
Blood donation agencies